Below is a list of Lao people (persons from Laos, or of Lao descent).

Resident Laotians
Kouprasith Abhay
Alexandra Bounxouei
Anouvong
Boua
Bounkhong
Bouasone Bouphavanh
Laasaenthai Bouvanaat
General Cheng
Fa Ngum
Fay Na
Huy of Champasak
Sisavath Keobounphanh
Kham Nai
Kham Souk of Champasak
Kham-Oun I
Khamphoui
Khamtum
Khun Lo
Ki Daophet Niuhuang
Lan Kham Deng
Somsavat Lengsavad
Manoi
Meunsai
Nam Viyaket
Nang Keo Phimpha
Nark of Champasak
No Muong
Nokasad
Ong Keo
Ong Kommandam
Chamleunesouk Ao Oudomphonh
Boun Oum
Oun Kham
Mam Manivan Phanivong
Moukdavanyh Santiphone
Phia Sing
Bountiem Phissamay
Phommathat
Kaysone Phomvihane
Photisarath
Souvanna Phouma
Nouhak Phoumsavanh
Phetsarath Rattanavongsa
Ouane Rattikone
Ratsadanay
Samsenethai
Thayavong Savang
Vong Savang
Sayakumane
Choummaly Sayasone
Siluck Saysanasy
Setthathirath
Khamtai Siphandon
Phoutlamphay Thiamphasone
Thongloun Sisoulith
Sompou
Souphanouvong
Soutchay Thammasith
Onchanh Thammavong
Mangkra Souvannaphouma
Souvannarath
Savang Vatthana
Douangdeuane Viravongs
Visunarat
Phoumi Vongvichit
Vilayphone Vongphachanh
Bounnhang Vorachith
Zakarine

Non-Resident Laotians
TC Huo
Jujubee
Malichansouk Kouanchao
Khan Malaythong
Thavisouk Phrasavath
Konerak Sinthasomphone victim of Jeffrey Dahmer
Bryan Thao Worra
Saymoukda Vongsay
Ananda Everingham
Bunleua Sulilat
Kamwaen
Siluck Saysanasy
Anne Keothavong
Vong Phaophanit

See also
List of people by nationality